Alice Carter may refer to:

People
 Alice Carter Cook (née Carter), (1865–1945), American botanist
 Alice Leslie Carter, American classic female blues singer of the 1920s
 Alice Carter (actress), cast in Exile (1990 film) and other films
 Alice Clare Carter, financial historian (1909-)

Fictional characters 
 Alice Carter, a character from the Torchwood television series
 Alice Carter (The Archers), née Aldridge, character in UK radio soap The Archers